Darod is a village and former non-salute Rajput princely state on Saurashtra peninsula in Gujarat, western India.

History 
The petty princely state, in Jhalawar prant, was ruled by Jhala Rajput Chieftains.

In 1901 it comprised a single village, with a population of 131, yielding 3,000 Rupees state revenue (1903-4, mostly from land), paying 416 tribute to the British and to Junagarh State.

References

External links and Sources 
History
 Imperial Gazetteer, on DSAL.UChicago.edu - Kathiawar

Princely states of Gujarat
Rajput princely states